Pluto Records is a record label started in 1999 by Eric Shirey and Brian Cobbel. Since 2002, it has been owned and operated by Brian Cobbel and based near Dallas, TX. It is primarily known for punk, metal and hardcore releases, although not exclusively. The label has been home and launching pad to such bands as Grammy-nominated metal act As I Lay Dying, HORSE the band, Luti-Kriss (Norma Jean), Society's Finest and more.
Pluto Records is currently a member of the Warner Music Group division of East West Records.

History
As I Lay Dying released their debut album, Beneath the Encasing of Ashes on Pluto Records in 2001 and also a split album with the band American Tragedy in 2002. They are now on Metal Blade Records where they have released additional albums, 2003's Frail Words Collapse, 2005's Shadows Are Security, 2007's An Ocean Between Us and The Powerless Rise in 2010. Their releases on Pluto have also been compiled and re-released by Metal Blade Records in 2006 as A Long March: The First Recordings. As I Lay Dying has gone on to sell over half a million records worldwide, and were nominated for a Grammy Award in 2008 for Best Metal Performance.

HORSE the band, who coined the term nintendocore describing their electro-metal sound, released their debut album, R. Borlax on Pluto Records in 2003. They are now on Koch Records and have released their second album, The Mechanical Hand, in 2005, and EP called Pizza in 2006, and their third album, A Natural Death, in 2007. Pluto Records' logo remains on all the bands' albums.

Norma Jean was on the label under their original moniker Luti-Kriss. Luti-Kriss released their first recording on Pluto Records in 1999. The band then signed to Solid State Records where they released one album before changing their name to Norma Jean because of confusion with the rapper Ludacris.

Current band list 

 Bloodjinn
 Broadcast Sea
 The Dead See
 Divide The Day
 DSGNS 
 Imperial
 My America Is Watching Tigers Die
 Spark is a Diamond

Former bands 

 Acedia
 American Tragedy
 As I Lay Dying
 Beauty To Ashes
 Canterbury Effect
 Dreaming of the Fifth
 Evelynn
 Horse the band
 The Jonbenet
 Kill Ratio
 Life in Pictures
 Lovelorn
 Luti-Kriss/Norma Jean
 Mindrage
 My Spacecoaster
 Nailed Promise
 The Orangeburg Massacre
 Society's Finest
 Shmunks For You
 Thirty Called Arson
 Travail
 With All Sincerity
 The Deadly
 Please Mr. Gravedigger
 The Underdog Conspiracy

See also 

 List of record labels

References

External links 

 

American record labels
Record labels established in 1999
Heavy metal record labels
Hardcore record labels
1999 establishments in Texas